Matthew Cook is an American mathematician.

Matthew or Matt Cook may also refer to:

Matt Cook (actor) (born 1984), American television and film actor
Matt Cook (historian), Birkbeck College professor
Matt Cook (rugby league) (born 1986), English rugby union and rugby league footballer
Matt Cook (sledge hockey) (1987–2010), Canadian ice sledge hockey player
Matthew Cook (rugby union), (born 1978), Spanish international rugby union player

See also
Matthew Cooke (disambiguation)